Borders of Belgium is a randonnée bicycle event of approximately  around the borders of Belgium, starting and ending at Wachtebeke.

References

 
Cycling in Belgium
Ultra-distance cycling
Wachtebeke